was a Japanese animation studio founded on March 15, 2013. The studio filled for bankruptcy in December 2019 with about 43 million yen in debt, including about 8 million yen to approximately 50 animators.

Establishment
Tear Studio was established in Suginami, Tokyo, Japan by Jun Katō. On March 15, 2013, Teartribe was founded as Tear Studio's overseas production department, aiming to work in partnership with Chinese studios experienced in the animation industry to achieve stable economic and production quality.

Works

Television series

Films

Original video animations

References

External links

  
 

 
Animation studios in Tokyo
Japanese animation studios
Defunct mass media companies of Japan
Japanese companies established in 2013
Japanese companies disestablished in 2019
Mass media companies established in 2013
Mass media companies disestablished in 2019
Suginami
Companies that have filed for bankruptcy in Japan